Smeaton is a village in the Canadian province of Saskatchewan within the Rural Municipality of Torch River No. 488 and Census Division No. 14. It is at the foot of Hanson Lake Road, which ends at Creighton near Flin Flon, Manitoba). Narrow Hills Provincial Park is 70 km north.

History 
Smeaton incorporated as a village on March 7, 1944.

Demographics 

References 

Villages in Saskatchewan
Torch River No. 488, Saskatchewan
Division No. 14, Saskatchewan